Kellner is a surname. Notable people with the surname include:

 Ádám Kellner (born 1986), Hungarian tennis player
 Alex Kellner (1924–1996), baseball pitcher
 Alexander Kellner (born 1961), Brazilian paleontologist
 Birgit Kellner, Austrian Buddhologist and Tibetologist
 Carl Kellner (optician) (1829–1855), German optician
 Carl Kellner (mystic) (1851–1905), Austrian mystic, founder of Ordo Templi Orientis
 Catherine Kellner (born 1970), American actress
 Dan Kellner (born 1976), American fencer and graphic designer
 Donald Ferdinand Kellner (1879–1935), Canadian politician
 Douglas Kellner (born 1943), American philosopher
 Ernest Augustus Kellner (1792–1839), British singer and pianist
 Esther Kellner (1908–1998), American author
 Friedrich Kellner (1885–1970), Justice Inspector and Nazi opponent
 Gyula Kellner (1871–1940), Hungarian athlete
 Jamie Kellner, American television executive
 Ján Kellner, S.J. (1912–1941), Slovak Catholic priest and missionary to USSR
 Johann Christoph Kellner (1736–1803), German composer, son of Johann Peter Kellner
 Johann Peter Kellner (1705–1772), German composer, father of Johann Christoph Kellner
 Leon Kellner (1859–1928), Grammarian, Shakespearean, and Zionist
 Lorenz Kellner (1811–1892), German educator
 Larry Kellner (born 1959), American businessman
 Micah Kellner (born 1978), American politician
 Michael Kellner (born 1977), German politician
 Oscar Kellner (1851–1911), German agronomist
 Paul Kellner (1890–1972), German swimmer
 Peter Kellner (born 1946), British journalist
 Petr Kellner (1964–2021), Czech businessman and wealthiest person in the Czech Republic
 Rosa Kellner (1910–1984), German athlete
 Saville Kellner (born 1961), South-African–American entrepreneur
 Uwe Kellner (born 1966), German rower
 Walt Kellner (1929–2006), American Major League Baseball player
 William Kellner (1900–1996), British-Austrian art director

See also 
 Kellner (coachbuilder), French coachbuilder
 Kelner

German-language surnames
Jewish surnames
Occupational surnames